Flatbed may refer to:

 Flatbed digital printer, the reproduction of digital images on physical surfaces
 Flatbed editor, a type of machine used for the editing of a motion picture film
 Flatbed scanner, an image scanner used for scanning paper or transparency originals into digital form
 Flatbed seat, airline seat that reclines to a full-horizontal flat position to form a bed
 Flatbed trolley, a rolling platform
 Flatbed truck, a type of truck which has an entirely flat, level body with absolutely no sides or roof
 Lockheed Flatbed, a proposed cargo aircraft design

See also 
 Conflat
 Flat (disambiguation)
 Flatcar
 Flat wagon